U.S. Route 31E (US 31E) is the easternmost of two parallel routes for U.S. Highway 31 from Nashville, Tennessee, to Louisville, Kentucky. (At one time, it split with U.S. Highway 31W at Sellersburg, Indiana, north of Louisville.)

Route description

Tennessee

US 31E begins as the Ellington Parkway at the corner of Main Street and US 31, US 31W, US 41 and US 431 (Spring Street) just east of Interstate 24 (I-24). The freeway's interchanges in the middle of the route mainly includes locally maintained streets such as Cleveland Street, East Trinity Lane, Hart Lane, and Broadmoor Drive.

A ramp directing Ellington Parkway's northbound traffic to I-65 north is provided at the Briley/Ellington junction. Access to Ellington Parkway southbound is also provided by a ramp from I-65 south via exit 90A. The road is named for former Tennessee governor Buford Ellington, who served two non-consecutive terms from 1959 to 1963, the other from 1967 to 1971. Ellington encouraged much road building throughout the state during his second term as governor.

After Nashville, the highway passes through Hendersonville and Gallatin, Tennessee. It never intersects Interstate 40.

Kentucky

U.S. Route 31E is the easternmost of two parallel routes for U.S. Highway 31 in Kentucky, in between each is Interstate 65 in Kentucky. At the north end is Louisville, Kentucky, starting at the George Rogers Clark Memorial Bridge. Going south, it goes through the towns of Mount Washington, Bardstown, New Haven, Hodgenville, Glasgow, and Scottsville before arriving at the Tennessee border. In the 19th century the same route was a stagecoach path between Louisville and Nashville, Tennessee, and before that a postal route at least by 1820.

Its only interchanges with interstates are in Jefferson County; both of which are beltways: Interstate 264 (Watterson Expressway) and the I-265/Gene Snyder Expressway. However, it has intersections with the state freeways of Martha Layne Collins Blue Grass Parkway (in Nelson County) and with the Louie B. Nunn Cumberland Parkway in Barren County.

There are various historical sites along 31E in Kentucky. Among them are Cave Hill Cemetery and Farmington Historic Plantation in Louisville, My Old Kentucky Home State Park in Bardstown, and Abraham Lincoln Birthplace National Historic Site just south of Hodgenville. Also, five historic monuments to the Civil War are along the path: three in Louisville, one in Bardstown, and one in Glasgow.

31E has been known as a dangerous road, with many risky spots. A historic one was at Coxs Creek in Nelson County, where a post office had to be relocated so traffic could see each other. Other dangerous spots in Nelson County where emergency personnel consider notorious are Gobel Lake Curve, Hibbs Lane, and High Grove. As of August 23, 2017, the Hibbs Lane and High Grove reroute sections are almost complete and are in service. Minor work is still being done to some intersections and signage.

When the rerouting of 31E in Nelson and Spencer Counties was being planned, a survey of historic sites that could have been affected by the new route was studied, especially if the sites could one day become listed on the National Register of Historic Places.

History

The American Association of State Highway Officials (AASHO) adopted a resolution against split routes in 1934. In order to eliminate the split in US 31 between Nashville, Tennessee, and Louisville, Kentucky, AASHO commissioned U.S. Route 37, replacing US 31E from the Louisville area south to Glasgow, Kentucky, where it then followed Kentucky Route 63 and several routes in Tennessee to Chattanooga. The rest of US 31E from Glasgow to Nashville was assigned U.S. Route 143. This proposed route was extended southwest to Centerville in 1938 and Jackson in 1944 via State Route 100 and State Route 20. US 31W would have become the main route of US 31.

Kentucky and Tennessee refused to accept the renumbering and never changed signage for the routes. In 1952, AASHO re-recognized the split, officially restoring the US 31E and US 31W designations.

US 31E once terminated at US 31 in Sellersburg, Indiana until 1980. It followed the current routing of US 31 from Sellersburg to Louisville. In Nashville, US 31E once followed Gallatin Pike through east Nashville. Sometime after 1997, US 31E was rerouted onto Ellington Parkway.

Major intersections

Special routes

Hendersonville bypass route

An unsigned portion consisting primarily of Tennessee State Route 386 is known as the U.S. Route 31E Bypass.

Glasgow business route

U.S. Route 31E Business starts near the Southgate Shopping Center 0.379 mile north of the Exit 11 interchange of the Louie B. Nunn Cumberland Parkway, and intersects Kentucky Routes 249 and 63 before reaching the Barren County Courthouse at the Public Square. It then joins US 68 Business for only 0.123 miles before right-turning onto North Race Street. US 31E Business then follows North Race Street, passes the T.J. Samson Hospital, and ends at an intersection with the regular US 31E alignment on the north side of town about one mile south of the Veterans Outer Loop.

Major intersections

U.S. Route 31E Truck

U.S. Route 31E Truck (US 31E Truck) is the truck route of US 31E in the Nelson County seat of Bardstown.

The truck route consists of the following designations: 
Bluegrass Parkway between exits 21 and 25. 
U.S. Route 150 between the Bluegrass Parkway and KY 245, and 
Kentucky Route 245 bypass from US 150 east of downtown to US 31E/150 north of downtown.

U.S. Route 31EX

U.S. Route 31EX (US 31EX) is the business route of US 31E in the Bullitt County town of Mount Washington. The only two major intersections it has besides the main alignment is with KY 44 and KY 2706 in the town's business district. At the intersection with KY 44, US 31EX is incorrectly signed as a Kentucky state route.

Major intersections

See also

Roads in Louisville, Kentucky
Roads in Nashville, Tennessee

References

External links

 

E
31 E
31 E
31 E
Freeways in Tennessee
Transportation in Davidson County, Tennessee
Transportation in Sumner County, Tennessee
Transportation in Louisville, Kentucky
Transportation in Nashville, Tennessee
Transportation in Allen County, Kentucky
Transportation in Barren County, Kentucky
Transportation in Hart County, Kentucky
Transportation in LaRue County, Kentucky
Transportation in Nelson County, Kentucky
Transportation in Spencer County, Kentucky
Transportation in Jefferson County, Kentucky